GlaxoSmithKline Pharmaceuticals Ltd is an Indian research-based pharmaceutical and healthcare company, and a subsidiary of GSK. The company's product portfolio includes prescription medicines and vaccines. Its prescription medicines range across therapeutic areas such as anti-infectives, dermatology, gynaecology, diabetes, oncology, cardiovascular disease and respiratory diseases. It also offers a range of vaccines, for the prevention of hepatitis A, hepatitis B, invasive disease caused by H, influenzae, chickenpox, diphtheria, pertussis, tetanus, rotavirus, cervical cancer and others.

History
It was founded 13 November 1924 in India under the name of H.J.Foster & Co. Limited as an Agency House for distributing Baby Food Glaxo, Joseph Nathan & Co. In 1950, it changed its name to Laboratories (I) Ltd.

References

Companies based in Mumbai
Pharmaceutical companies of India
Pharmaceutical companies established in 1924
GSK plc
Indian companies established in 1924
Companies listed on the National Stock Exchange of India
Companies listed on the Bombay Stock Exchange